Richard Griggs (died 1883) was a state legislator and author in Mississippi. He also served as a court clerk.

He was born in Tennessee and enslaved, having had more than a dozen owners including Nathan B. Forrest. He served as Mississippi’s commissioner of immigration and agriculture.

He authored Guide to Mississippi.

References

African-American state legislators in Mississippi
19th-century American politicians
1883 deaths
Year of birth missing